Warnow-Ost was an Amt in the former district of Bad Doberan, in Mecklenburg-Vorpommern, Germany. The seat of the Amt was in Dummerstorf. It was disbanded in June 2009.

The Amt Warnow-Ost consisted of the following municipalities:
 Damm
 Dummerstorf
 Kavelstorf
 Kessin
 Lieblingshof
 Prisannewitz

Former Ämter in Mecklenburg-Western Pomerania
Rostock (district)